The Philip Fries House is a historic house located along Cohansey-Daretown Road in the Friesburg section of Alloway Township in Salem County, New Jersey. The Federal brick house, built in 1808, and associated barn were added to the National Register of Historic Places on September 28, 1990, for significance in architecture.

See also
 National Register of Historic Places listings in Salem County, New Jersey

References

External links
 

Alloway Township, New Jersey
Houses in Salem County, New Jersey
Houses completed in 1808
Brick buildings and structures
Federal architecture in New Jersey
National Register of Historic Places in Salem County, New Jersey
Houses on the National Register of Historic Places in New Jersey
New Jersey Register of Historic Places